Nasonovia is a genus of true bugs belonging to the family Aphididae.

The species of this genus are found in Europe, Australia and Northern America.

Species:
 Nasonovia acyrthosiphon (Richards, 1963) 
 Nasonovia alatavica Kadyrbekov, 1995

References

Aphididae